George Babington Parker (3 September 1839 – 13 March 1915) was a nineteenth-century Member of Parliament in Canterbury, New Zealand.

Parker was born in 1839. His parents were the judge Sir James Parker and his wife Mary Parker (née Babington). His grandfather was Thomas Babington. Archibald Smith was his brother-in-law, and James Parker was his younger brother.

He died in London in 1915.

References

Members of the New Zealand House of Representatives
1839 births
1915 deaths
New Zealand MPs for South Island electorates
19th-century New Zealand politicians